Benn Gilbert Kamoto (born 14 June 1990), better known by his stage name Gemini Major, is a Malawian-born South African record producer and singer-songwriter. He was signed to Family Tree Records, a South African independent record label found by Cassper Nyovest.

Early life and career 
Gemini Major finished high school in 2007 and graduated in I.T. in 2009. In the same year, he moved to Durban, South Africa to pursue his dream as an artist and record producer.

He has produced for a number of artists in a variety of genres including R&B, hip-hop, house, dancehall, pop and gospel. His portfolio includes production used in TV shows such as Gold Diggers, Forever Young and Mo Love.

In 2013 he moved to Johannesburg. After a chance meeting with Cassper Nyovest and his team at a video shoot for a song that Major had produced, he joined the Family Tree team. After the release of Nasty C's hit single "Juice Back", Major has become the go-to producer for some of South Africa's leading hip hop artists.

In 2015 Major was nominated for Producer of the Year at the South Africa Hip Hop Awards alongside South Africa's best hip hop producers such as Anatii, Riky Rick, Ganja Beats and Tweezy.

He released a single named, "Church" on 28 September 2017.

On November 20, 2020, his  EP Slum Kid was released in South Africa. It features  Nasty C, Riky Rick, Tellaman, AKA, The Big Hash and Emtee.

Discography

Albums

Singles

As lead artist

Production discography

Singles produced

Awards and nominations

References

External links 

1990 births
Living people
People from Gauteng
People from Johannesburg
South African record producers
South African musicians
Malawian record producers
21st-century Malawian male singers
Malawian emigrants to South Africa